Toogee may refer to:
 Toogee people,  an Aboriginal Tasmanian people
 Toogee language, a possible Aboriginal language of Tasmania

Language and nationality disambiguation pages